Linda Park (born July 9, 1978) is a South Korean-born American actress, best known for her portrayal of communications officer character Hoshi Sato in the television series Star Trek: Enterprise.

Early life
Park was born in South Korea and raised in San Jose, California. She participated in a number of theatrical productions in her teens at Notre Dame High School and Bellarmine College Preparatory.

In 2000, she received a Bachelor of Fine Arts degree from Boston University. During her college career, she spent a semester in England, studying at the London Academy of Music and Dramatic Art and the Royal Academy of Dramatic Art. Her college stage credits included Mad Forest, Lysistrata, Cyrano de Bergerac, Richard III, and The Trojan Women.

Career

In 2001, Park had a small role in the feature film Jurassic Park III (2001) as Ellie Satler's assistant.

Also in 2001, less than a year after graduation, she was cast in the role of Hoshi Sato in the sixth series of the Star Trek franchise, Star Trek: Enterprise, which premiered in September 2001. Sato is the ship's communications officer, with a natural gift for translating alien languages. Park herself is fluent in English and Korean, and also speaks some French.

In August 2003, Park produced and starred in her first short film, My Prince, My Angel (2003).

In October 2003, she starred in UA's world premiere of the Mary Fengar Gail’s play Fuchsia. From October 19 to November 11, 2005, she played Clytemnestra in a New York City production of Agamemnon. In 2011, she played the role of Anne Deever in a production of Arthur Miller's All My Sons at the Matrix Theater in Los Angeles. She is also the co-founder of the theater company Underground Asylum.

In 2009, Park became a series regular in the second season of Crash, playing the role of Maggie Cheon on the Starz Network; she co-starred in thirteen episodes. The show was subsequently cancelled after the death of Dennis Hopper.

Personal life
Park married actor Daniel Bess on October 11, 2014. On June 17, 2018, she gave birth to their first child, a son.

Park was diagnosed with lupus in 1997.

Park is an active student of dance, remarking that "dancing has always been my second love". She has continued to study and practice ballet, among other dance forms.

Filmography

References

External links

 

1978 births
Living people
Actresses from San Jose, California
Actresses from Seoul
Alumni of the London Academy of Music and Dramatic Art
Alumni of RADA
American actresses of Korean descent
American television actresses
Boston University College of Fine Arts alumni
South Korean emigrants to the United States
21st-century American actresses